WASP-36 is a yellow main sequence star in the Hydra constellation.

Star characteristics
WASP-36 is a yellow main sequence star of spectral class G2, similar to the Sun. It has an  unconfirmed stellar companion with apparent magnitude 14.03.

Planetary system 
In 2010, the SuperWASP survey found the Hot Jupiter class planet WASP-36b using the transit method. Its temperature was measured to be 1705 K. The planetary transmission spectrum taken in 2016 has turned out to be anomalous: the planet appears to be surrounded by a blue-tinted halo that is too wide to be an atmosphere and may represent a measurement error.

Planetary dayside temperature measured in 2020 is 1440 K.

References 

Planetary systems with one confirmed planet
Hydra (constellation)
G-type main-sequence stars
Planetary transit variables
36
J08461929-0801370